Hothouse Flowers are an Irish rock band that combine traditional Irish music with influences from soul, gospel and rock. Formed in 1985 in Dublin, they started as street performers. Their first album, People (1988), was the most successful debut album in Irish history, reaching No. 1 in Ireland and No. 2 in the UK. After two more albums and extensive touring, the group separated in 1994. Since getting back together in 1998, the band members have been sporadically issuing new songs and touring, but also pursuing solo careers.

Career
The group first formed in 1985 when Liam Ó Maonlaí and Fiachna Ó Braonáin, who had known each other as children in an Irish-speaking school, Coláiste Eoin in Booterstown, Dublin, began performing as street musicians, also known as buskers, on the streets of Dublin as "The Incomparable Benzini Brothers". They were soon joined by Peter O'Toole and had won a street-entertainer award within a year. They renamed the group "Hothouse Flowers" (the name was suggested by singer Maria Doyle Kennedy during a brain-storming by band-members and friends in the Trinity College Arts Block café) and began writing songs and performing throughout Ireland. Rolling Stone magazine called them "the best-unsigned band in Europe".

In 1986, Bono from the band U2 saw the Flowers performing on television and offered his support. They released their first single, "Love Don't Work This Way", on U2's Mother Records label, which quickly led to a deal with the PolyGram subsidiary London Records.

Their first album, People, was released in May 1988 and was the most successful debut album in Irish history. It reached the #1 slot in Ireland within a week and eventually reached No. 2 in the UK Albums Chart. The first single off the album "Feet on the Ground" shot to the No. 1 slot in Ireland on 19 March 1988. The international success of the album received a boost when a music video for the first single, "Don't Go", was played in the interval between contestants and the scoring in the 1988 Eurovision Song Contest. This propelled the song to No. 11 in the UK Singles Chart, the highest position the band would ever achieve in this chart. In September 1988, the band appeared on the bill at the Reading Festival. In June 1989 they played at the Glastonbury Festival, and appeared there again the following year.

The group's second album, Home was released in June 1990. It was recorded sporadically during extensive touring; with sessions in Dublin, London, a rented house with a mobile recording set-up in Carlow, Ireland, and one day of work with Daniel Lanois in New Orleans, while Bob Dylan was taking a break from his sessions with Lanois. The album did not have the overwhelming success of the first record, but it did reach No. 1 in Australia in 1991. "Give It Up" and "I Can See Clearly Now" (a cover version of the Johnny Nash song) from the album reached No. 30 and 23 respectively in the UK Singles Chart.

In 1989, the Flowers collaborated with the Indigo Girls on their song "Closer To Fine", which became a US hit, and led to some exposure in the United States for the group (albeit limited, as their contribution to the song was uncredited).

In January 1992, the group appeared (as themselves) in an episode of the popular BBC drama series Lovejoy, entitled No Strings.

In 1992, Hothouse Flowers joined Def Leppard – the combined group going by the name The Acoustic Hippies From Hell – to record three songs ("From the Inside", a cover of the Rolling Stones' "You Can't Always Get What You Want", and a cover of Jimi Hendrix's "Little Wing") that were included as B-sides on Def Leppard's single "Have You Ever Needed Someone So Bad", from their album Adrenalize.

Songs from the Rain was released in March 1993. Though it received good reviews and achieved some chart success in Australia and Ireland, worldwide sales were disappointing. In an attempt to boost record sales (and especially to break into the United States charts), the record label and the band's management kept the group on the road almost continuously for the entire year. The band also participated in the Another Roadside Attraction tour in Canada that year, and collaborated with The Tragically Hip, Crash Vegas, Midnight Oil and Daniel Lanois on the one-off single "Land" to protest forest clearcutting in British Columbia.

By early 1994, Ó Maonlaí had decided that the group was suffering from physical, mental and creative exhaustion, and he called for a year-long sabbatical.

The year-long break turned into several years, as the band members recouped their energy and experienced changes in their personal lives, including divorces, marriages, the birth of children and the death of Ó Maonlaí's father. The group also split from their long-time manager, and Leo Barnes (saxophone) and Jerry Fehily (drum kit) left the group. O'Toole and Ó Braonáin spent some of their time off from the Hothouse Flowers recording and touring with Michelle Shocked. Ó Maonlaí worked with Tim Finn and Andy White, while also studying traditional Irish music.

In May 1998 they released Born. Joined by Wayne Sheehy on drums and Rob Malone on bass guitar, this album contained extensive songwriting contributions from O'Toole, who (freed from his bass responsibilities) played mostly guitar, bouzouki and keyboards on the recording. The music also incorporated more elements of electronic loops, synthesizers and studio effects. The following month, they appeared at the 1998 Glastonbury Festival.

By 1999 they had reached the end of their contract with London Records, and both the label and the band decided not to renew. The label head allowed the group the rights to record songs from their past London releases and produce a live record. Live was self-released by the group later that year, taken mostly from an October 1998 show in the National Stadium, Dublin, with one track from a November show in Tokyo. Sheehy and Malone left the group shortly after the release of the record. Dave Clarke, formerly of Blue in Heaven, joined on drums and O'Toole returned to the bass.

In 2000 London Records released a compilation album of songs from their four previous albums titled Hothouse Flowers: The Best Of – 2000.

During the band's official hiatus between Songs From the Rain and Born, band members had both written songs individually, and sporadically got together to write collaboratively. Some of these songs were never released, while others altered significantly to become some of the tracks on Born. In 2003 the Flowers collected these unreleased recordings and issued them as Vaults: Volume 1.

In February 2004 the band released their latest album, Into Your Heart, produced by the band and John Reynolds.  The first single, "Your Love Goes On", reached #3 on the Irish charts. The album also reached #3 on the Irish Album Chart. The record was released on the RubyMusic label in Europe and distributed by Redeye in the United States. They have toured extensively in support of the record, including a performance at the Glastonbury Festival in 2004. Peter O'Toole left the band after this.

Ó Maonlaí has done several tours as a solo acoustic performer and released an album in 2005 called Rian.

In 2007, Ó Braonáin appeared on Belinda Carlisle's album, Voila, singing a duet with her on a cover of "Bonnie and Clyde". Hothouse Flowers appeared at the Glastonbury Festival Acoustic tent in 2007. Ó Braonáin and Clarke have also collaborated with a former member of The Pogues in the group Pre-Nup, who have opened some shows in America for Hothouse Flowers. An album by Pre-Nup, Hell to Pay, was released on 4 September 2007.

In late 2008, Ó Maonlaí released his follow up album to Rian, entitled To Be Touched. In 2015, O'Toole rejoined the band, and they toured the UK in October and November of that year, with the tour named "Away with the Traveling Circus". During an interview on "The Imelda May Show" in Ireland, the band confirmed they were working on a new album, tentatively scheduled for release in early 2016. Some material from the album was played during the tour, and the album was finally released on 17 November 2016, called Lets Do This Thing and recorded at Windmill Lane Studios in Dublin.

The band played a live version of their cover "I Can See Clearly Now" on the premiere episode of Amazon Prime's The Grand Tour first made available to stream in November 2016.
As a result, they saw an upswing in  popularity, with "I Can See Clearly Now" going to no. 1 on the iTunes Rock Chart Singles in the UK.

Former band member, saxophone player Leo Barnes, died of an apparent brain hemorrhage in April, 2022.

Members

 Current
 Liam Ó Maonlaí – vocals, keyboards, guitar 
 Fiachna Ó Braonáin – guitar, vocals 
 Peter O'Toole – bass , guitar , backing vocals 
 Dave Clarke – drums 
 Martin Brunsden – double bass 

 Former
 Michan Walker – bass 
 John Paul Tansey – drums 
 Jerry Fehily – drums 
 Leo Barnes – saxophone, backing vocals 
 Wayne Sheehy – drums 
 Rob Malone – bass 
 Kieran Kennedy – guitar 

 Timeline

Discography

Studio albums

Compilation albums

Live albums

Singles

Various artists compilations
Larry Kirwan's Celtic Invasion – 2013 – Sí Do Mhaimeo Í
No Prima Donna: The Songs of Van Morrison – 1994 – Bright Side of the Road

References

External links
Hothouse Flowers' official website
RubyMusic (Irish label)
RedEye (U.S. label)
Liam O Maonlai's record label

Irish rock music groups
Irish folk rock groups
Irish alternative rock groups
Irish buskers
Musical groups from County Dublin
Musical groups established in 1985
1985 establishments in Ireland